Tell Her may refer to:

"Tell Her" (Lonestar song), 2000
"Tell Her" (Rizzle Kicks song), for the 2014 Wimbledon Championships with a video featuring Maria Sharapova.
"Tell Her", song by The Brook Brothers G. Brook, R. Brook 1961
"Tell Her", song by Seona Dancing	Gervais, Macrae 1983
"Tell Her", Jesse McCartney song from his 2006 album Right Where You Want Me
"Tell Him" (Bert Berns song), originally recorded as "Tell Her" in 1962 by Johnny Thunder
Tell Her (film), a 2020 Russian children's drama film

See also
Tell Him (disambiguation)